Guyhirne railway station was a station at Ring's End, near Guyhirn, Cambridgeshire on the Great Northern and Great Eastern Joint Railway between Spalding and March.  It was opened originally by the GNR in 1867. An auction took place in 1867 of items linked to the construction of the railway.
It was closed to passengers by the British Transport Commission, due to low usage, in 1953.

Goods traffic continued at the station until 1964, whilst the line passing through it remained open until November 1982.  The station has since been demolished, along with the viaduct that carried the line through the village it served.

References

External links
 Guyhirne station on navigable 1946 O. S. map

Disused railway stations in Cambridgeshire
Former Great Northern and Great Eastern Joint Railway stations
Railway stations in Great Britain opened in 1867
Railway stations in Great Britain closed in 1953
Fenland District
Guyhirn